Perfect Writer is a word processor computer program published by Perfect Software for CP/M, subsequently rewritten and released as Perfect II by Thorn EMI Computer Software for IBM PC compatible computers. It was written in C and famous for its stability. It was an enhanced version of MINCE, which itself was a version of Emacs for microcomputer platforms. Emacs itself was too heavyweight to fit within the 64kb RAM limit of most microcomputers. Like MINCE, it included a floppy disk based virtual memory system. 

In the UK, it was bundled with the short lived Advance 86B PC (a near IBM compatible). It supported up to 7 buffers, had a character transpose command, undo, footnotes, and indexing. Its capabilities were very close to that of the dedicated word processors of the day. Perfect Writer's ability to cut and paste between documents open in multiple buffers was an advantage over WordStar.

Perfect Writer supported a number of add-on programs, Perfect Speller and Perfect Thesaurus, also published by Perfect Software, along with third party software such as Plu*Perfect published by Plu*Perfect Systems. Plu*Perfect included "D", a dired-like file browser that was deemed "the best of all directory displayers" by Stewart Brand.

Perfect Writer was originally published by Perfect Software. Later versions of the product were developed and maintained by Knowledge Engineering in Austin, Texas. The thesaurus was designed written and maintained by George O. Jenkins, Jr.

References

External links
 Text Editors Wiki
 Perfect Writer screenshot gallery

Emacs
CP/M software
Commodore 128 software
DOS software
Text editors
Word processors
Discontinued software